The Dominion is a race held at the Addington Raceway each year in Christchurch, New Zealand for standardbred horses. 

The race is run in November over a distance of 3200 m on the Friday of New Zealand Cup week.  It is on the same day as the New Zealand Free For All. 

It is one of the major harness races for trotters rather than pacers, and is considered to be the trotters equivalent of the New Zealand Trotting Cup. Another similar race is the Rowe Cup held each May in Auckland.

Records
Most wins:
 3 - Lyell Creek (1999, 2000, 2004)

Most wins by a driver:
 8 - Anthony Butt (1987, 1999, 2000, 2001, 2003, 2004, 2007, 2011)
 4 - J Bryce (1916, 1919, 1928, 1929)
 3 - Maurice Holmes (1932, 1954, 1955)
 3 - Ricky May (1998, 2010, 2016)

Winners list

See also 
 Harness racing
 Harness racing in New Zealand

Other major races
 Rowe Cup
 Auckland Trotting Cup
 New Zealand Trotting Cup
 Great Northern Derby
 Noel J Taylor Mile
 New Zealand Messenger
 Inter Dominion Pacing Championship
 Inter Dominion Trotting Championship

References

Horse races in New Zealand
Harness racing in New Zealand